Joseph Clare (4 February 1910 – 23 September 1987) was an English footballer who scored 41 goals from 90 appearances in the Football League playing for Accrington Stanley, Norwich City and Lincoln City. He played at outside left or left back.

He was on the books of Manchester City and Arsenal, without representing those clubs in the league, and was with Wigan Borough in their final season in the Football League, when the club folded in October 1931 and its results were expunged; Clare did not appear for their first team that season. He played in the Southern League with Margate. He later became first-team trainer for Bournemouth & Boscombe Athletic.

References

1910 births
1987 deaths
People from Westhoughton
English footballers
Association football forwards
Manchester City F.C. players
Wigan Borough F.C. players
Accrington Stanley F.C. (1891) players
Arsenal F.C. players
Margate F.C. players
Norwich City F.C. players
Lincoln City F.C. players
Ruston Bucyrus F.C. players
English Football League players
Southern Football League players
AFC Bournemouth non-playing staff
Place of death missing